Marcus Lucas (born March 1, 1992) is a former American football tight end. He was signed by the Carolina Panthers as an undrafted free agent in 2014. He played college football at Missouri.

College career
Lucas played college football for the Missouri Tigers. He appeared in 49 games at Missouri from 2010 to 2013 and had 130 receptions for 1,638 yards and 11 touchdowns.

Professional career

Carolina Panthers
Lucas was signed by the Carolina Panthers after going undrafted in the 2014 NFL Draft on May 16, 2014. Lucas was waived by the Panthers during final cuts on August 30, 2014. He was signed to the Panthers' practice squad on September 1, 2014. On January 13, 2015, he signed a reserve/future contract with the Panthers. On September 5, 2015, he was released by the Panthers.

Miami Dolphins
On September 29, 2015, Lucas was signed to the Miami Dolphins' practice squad. On the following day, he was released by the Dolphins.

Chicago Bears
On December 15, 2015, Lucas was signed to the Chicago Bears' practice squad.

On January 4, 2016, Lucas signed a futures contract with the Bears. He was waived on May 16, 2016.

Carolina Panthers (second stint)
On May 17, 2016, Lucas signed with the Panthers. On September 3, 2016, he was waived by the Panthers as part of final roster cuts.

Seattle Seahawks
On September 5, 2016, Lucas was signed to the Seahawks' practice squad. He signed a reserve/future contract with the Seahawks on January 16, 2017.

On August 21, 2017, Lucas was waived/injured by the Seahawks and placed on injured reserve. He was released on August 27, 2017.

Indianapolis Colts
On September 26, 2017, Lucas was signed to the Indianapolis Colts' practice squad. He was released on October 10, 2017.

Oakland Raiders
On December 22, 2017, Lucas was signed to the Oakland Raiders' practice squad.

Detroit Lions
On May 14, 2018, Lucas signed with the Detroit Lions. He was released on August 31, 2018.

Seattle Seahawks (second stint)
On September 3, 2018, Lucas was signed to the Seattle Seahawks' practice squad. He was released on October 9, 2018.

San Francisco 49ers
On December 11, 2018, Lucas was signed to the San Francisco 49ers' practice squad. He signed a reserve/future contract with the 49ers on January 2, 2019. He was waived on May 7, 2019.

Dallas Cowboys
On August 7, 2019, Lucas was signed by the Dallas Cowboys. He was released on August 31, 2019.

St. Louis BattleHawks
In October 2019, Lucas was drafted by the St. Louis BattleHawks as part of the 2020 XFL Draft. He had his contract terminated when the league suspended operations on April 10, 2020.

References

External links
Missouri Tigers bio
Carolina Panthers bio

1992 births
Living people
People from Liberty, Missouri
Players of American football from Missouri
Sportspeople from the Kansas City metropolitan area
American football wide receivers
Missouri Tigers football players
Carolina Panthers players
Miami Dolphins players
Chicago Bears players
Seattle Seahawks players
Indianapolis Colts players
Oakland Raiders players
Detroit Lions players
San Francisco 49ers players
Dallas Cowboys players
St. Louis BattleHawks players